Eva Ruchpaul (born March 13, 1928 in Béziers) is one of the first yoga teachers in Europe, a French yoga teacher trainer, and author of books on hatha yoga.

Biography 

Eva Ruchpaul was born in Béziers in the south of France in 1928. At the age of 18 months, she contracted poliomyelitis and sought at a young age to re-educate her ailing body. In hatha-yoga she found a revitalising source of energy. Eva studied the theory of yoga with her father, a professor of philosophy. She continued her studies with her husband, a Brahman.
Since 1969 she has appeared in numerous TV shows and press articles in France. In 1970, she created a yoga class, encouraged by her husband. This course is one of the first in Europe.

Institut Eva Ruchpaul 

The Eva Ruchpaul Institute of Yoga was founded by Ruchpaul in 1971 to train yoga teachers. It is officially registered with the Paris Academic Academy and has trained more than a thousand teachers and many amateurs at all levels of ability.

Books 

 1975 La demeure du silence: entretiens avec Anne Philipe (with Anne Philippe). Éditions Gallimard.
 1976 Philosophie et pratique du yoga. Éditions Denoël.
 1978 Hatha-yoga bien tempéré. Presses universitaires de France.
 1987 Le Hatha-yoga. Librairie générale française.
 2004 Précis de hatha yoga. Ellébore éditions.
 2018 Yoga: sources & variations (with Colette Poggi). Ellébore Editions.
 2019 Dans la confidence du souffle. Almora librairie & éditions.

Video 

 1984 Hatha Yoga: l'art de se faire (with André Maurice, Eva Ruchpaul and Ananda Ruchpaul)

References 

1928 births
Yoga teachers
French health and wellness writers
Living people